Yoselin Noemy Franco Marroquín (born 1994), known as Noemy Franco, is a Guatemalan footballer who plays as a goalkeeper for American college Johnson & Wales University–North Miami Wildcats and the Guatemala women's national team.

References 

1994 births
Living people
Women's association football goalkeepers
Guatemalan women's footballers
Sportspeople from Guatemala City
Guatemala women's international footballers
Alianza Petrolera players
Johnson & Wales University alumni
Guatemalan expatriate footballers
Guatemalan expatriate sportspeople in Colombia
Expatriate women's footballers in Colombia
Guatemalan expatriate sportspeople in the United States
Expatriate women's soccer players in the United States

.